Peter Needham may refer to:
 Peter Needham (cricketer)
 Peter Needham (scholar)